The 1966 NFL season was the 47th regular season of the National Football League, and the first season in which the Super Bowl was played, though it was called the AFL-NFL World Championship Game. The league expanded to 15 teams with the addition of the Atlanta Falcons, making a bye necessary each week for one team.

This was the last season that the NFL was divided only into two separate conferences, and only one postseason round was played, that being between the two conference champions. The season concluded with the first AFL-NFL World Championship Game; the NFL champion Green Bay Packers defeated the AFL's Kansas City Chiefs  at the Los Angeles Memorial Coliseum on January 15, 1967. The interleague championship game would eventually be named the Super Bowl, and the 1966 season is now considered the first of the Super Bowl era.

Pat Studstill for the Detroit Lions set a record for consecutive games with more than 125 receiving yards with five, a record which was not tied until Calvin 'Megatron' Johnson several decades later. He also became the 3rd ever player to complete a 99-yard pass play.

The highest scoring game in NFL history also took place during this season, with the then Washington Redskins defeating the New York Giants in a Week 12 showdown with a final score of 72–41.

The AFL-NFL merger agreement

As the competitive war between the NFL and the American Football League reached its peak, the two leagues agreed on June 8, 1966 to merge. Under the agreement:
The two leagues would combine to form an expanded league with 24 teams, which would be increased to 26 teams by 1969, and to 28 teams by 1970 or soon thereafter.
All existing teams would be retained, and none of them would be moved outside of their metropolitan areas.
While maintaining separate schedules through 1969, the leagues agreed to play an annual AFL-NFL World Championship Game beginning in January 1967 (this game was eventually renamed the Super Bowl, with all four AFL-NFL matchups being retroactively renamed as such).
The two leagues would officially merge in 1970 to form one league with two conferences (named American Football Conference and National Football Conference).

Expansion
On June 3, 1965, the NFL announced its plans to add two teams in  Four days later on June 7, the eight franchises of the rival American Football League (AFL) voted unanimously to add two teams in 1966, an AFL franchise was awarded to Atlanta the next day.

The NFL awarded the first of the two expansion franchises to the city of Atlanta on  Commissioner Pete Rozelle granted ownership of the Atlanta Falcons to Rankin Smith, Sr. and they were awarded the first pick in the 1966 NFL Draft, as well as the final pick in each of the first five rounds.  The league also provided the Falcons with an expansion draft six weeks later.

The AFL had originally targeted Atlanta and Philadelphia, but its two expansion teams became the Miami Dolphins in 1966 and the Cincinnati Bengals in 1968.

The competition with the AFL for Atlanta forced the first to be added a year early. The odd number of teams (15) in 1966 resulted in one idle team (bye) each week, with each team playing fourteen games over fifteen weeks (similar to : twelve games over thirteen weeks). The second expansion team, the New Orleans Saints, joined the NFL as planned in 1967 as its sixteenth franchise. Scheduled byes in the NFL's regular season did not return until .

Expansion Draft
The 1966 NFL expansion draft was held on February 15, 1966, with Falcons selecting 42 players from the other NFL teams.

Draft
The 1966 NFL Draft was held on November 27, 1965 at New York City's Summit Hotel. With the first pick, the Atlanta Falcons selected linebacker Tommy Nobis from The University of Texas.

Major rule changes
Goal posts were standardized in the NFL. In , the new "slingshot" goal post was made standard, with one curved support from the ground.

The new goal-post rule is often referred to as the "Don Chandler Rule", referring to the placekicker for the Green Bay Packers.  Although widely denied, the height increase of the uprights was in reaction to the previous season's Western Conference playoff game at Lambeau Field in Green Bay.  Chandler kicked a controversial field goal that tied the game with under two minutes remaining.  The kick was high above the upright, and many spectators thought that the kick missed; however, the kick was ruled good by field judge Jim Tunney.  Chandler later hit a field goal that defeated the Baltimore Colts in overtime. The following week, the Packers defeated the Cleveland Browns in the NFL Championship Game, their first of three consecutive league titles.

Another rule change born from the 1965 Western Conference playoff was two officials (the back judge and field judge) were stationed under each upright for field goal and extra point attempts.

Conference races
In the Western Conference, Green Bay's first loss was in Week 5, falling 21–20 in San Francisco to tie them with the Rams.  The Rams lost 35–7 to Minnesota the next week, and Green Bay stayed in front until Week 9, when Minnesota beat them 20–17.  Baltimore's 19–7 win over Atlanta briefly tied it with the Packers at 7–2–0 in Week 10, but the Colts lost to Detroit the next week, 20–14.  The Packers clinched the title in Week 13.

In the Eastern Conference, the St. Louis Cardinals took the early lead, winning their first five games.  (The Dallas Cowboys were also unbeaten, but due to a bye in Week One, they had played one fewer game and thus were a half-game behind the Cardinals in the standings.)  The unbeaten teams met in Week 6, and both were still unbeaten after they played to a 10–10 tie.  However, both teams suffered their first defeat the next week, with St. Louis losing at Washington, 26–20, and the Cowboys falling in Cleveland, 30–21.  In Week 9 (November 6), St. Louis beat the Giants, 20–17, while Dallas came up short in a 24–23 loss to the Eagles.  The next week, Dallas won at Washington 31–30 on a field goal with 0:15 left, while the Cards fell at Pittsburgh, 30–9, cutting their safety margin to a half-game again.  St. Louis had a bye in Week 11, and a 20–7 Dallas victory over Pittsburgh gave the Cards and Cowboys records of 7–2–1.  Both teams won the next week, setting up the stage for their December 4 meeting in Dallas during Week 13.  The Cards took a 10–7 lead in the first quarter, but Dallas won 31–17 to take over the conference lead.  In Week Fourteen, Dallas hosted Washington, and lost 34–31 on a field goal at 0:08.  The Cardinals were in a must-win game against what should have been an easy opponent, the new (2–10–0) Atlanta Falcons.  Instead, the Falcons notched their third win and virtually ended St. Louis's hopes to go to the title game.  The St. Louis Cardinals, who lost again the next week, never got that close to the Super Bowl again before moving to Phoenix in 1988.

 A bye week was necessary in 1966, as the league had an odd-number (15) of teams; one team was idle each week.

Final standings

Postseason

NFL Championship Game

Green Bay 34, Dallas 27 at the Cotton Bowl in Dallas, Texas, on January 1, 1967

AFL Championship Game
Kansas City 31, Buffalo 7, at War Memorial Stadium in Buffalo, New York, on January 1, 1967

Playoff Bowl
The Playoff Bowl was between the conference runners-up, for third place in the league. This was its seventh year and it was played a week after the title game.
Baltimore 20, Philadelphia 14 at Orange Bowl, Miami, Florida, January 8, 1967

AFL–NFL World Championship Game

The Green Bay Packers defeated the Kansas City Chiefs, league champion of the 1966 American Football League season, 35–10, at Los Angeles Memorial Coliseum, on January 15, 1967.

Awards

Coaching changes
Atlanta Falcons: Norb Hecker became the expansion team's first head coach.
Los Angeles Rams: Harland Svare was replaced by George Allen.
St. Louis Cardinals: Wally Lemm was replaced by Charley Winner.
Pittsburgh Steelers: Mike Nixon was replaced by Bill Austin.
Washington Redskins: Bill McPeak was replaced by Otto Graham.

Stadium changes
 The expansion Atlanta Falcons began play at Atlanta Stadium
 The St. Louis Cardinals opened the new Civic Center Busch Memorial Stadium, replacing the older Busch Stadium (Sportsman's Park)

References

 1966 NFL Season Schedule
 NFL Record and Fact Book
 NFL History 1961–1970 (Last accessed December 4, 2005)
 Total Football: The Official Encyclopedia of the National Football League
 When Pride Still Mattered, A Life of Vince Lombardi, by David Maraniss, 1999, p. 381,

National Football League seasons
National Football League